Ricardo Matos may refer to:

 Ricardo Matos (footballer, born 1979), Portuguese footballer, goalkeeper
 Ricardo Matos (footballer, born 2000), Portuguese footballer, forward